The siege of Nice occurred in 1543 and was part of the Italian War of 1542–46 in which Francis I and Suleiman the Magnificent collaborated as part of the Franco-Ottoman alliance against the Holy Roman Emperor Charles V, and Henry VIII of England. At that time, Nice was under the control of Charles III, Duke of Savoy, an ally of Charles V. This is part of the 1543–1544 Mediterranean campaign of Barbarossa.

Siege

In the Mediterranean, active naval collaboration took place between France and the Ottoman Empire to fight against Spanish forces, following a request by Francis I, conveyed by Antoine Escalin des Aimars. 
The French forces, led by François de Bourbon, and the Ottoman forces, led by Hayreddin Barbarossa, first joined at Marseilles in August 1543. Although the Duchy of Savoy, of which Nice was a part, had been a French protectorate for a century, Francis I chose to attack the city of Nice with the allied force, mainly because Charles III, Duke of Savoy had angered him by marrying Beatrice of Portugal, thus becoming an ally of the Habsburgs.

François de Bourbon had already attempted to make a surprise attack on Nice once, but had been repulsed by Andrea Doria.

Arrival of the Ottoman fleet
Following an agreement between Francis I and Suleyman the Magnificent, through the intervention of the French ambassador in Constantinople, Captain Polin, a fleet of 110 galleys under Hayreddin Barbarossa left from the Sea of Marmara in mid-May 1543. He then raided the coasts of Sicily and Southern Italy through the month of June, anchoring in front of Rome at the mouth of the Tiber on 29 June, while Polin wrote reassurances that attacks against Rome would not take place.

Barbarossa arrived with his fleet, accompanied by the French Ambassador Polin, at Île Saint-Honorat on 5 July. As almost nothing had been prepared on the French side to assist the Ottoman fleet, Polin was dispatched to meet with Francis I at Marolles and ask him for support. Meanwhile, Barbarossa went to the harbour of Toulon on 10 July and then was received with honours at the harbour of Marseille on 21 July, where he joined the French forces under the Governor of Marseille, François, Count of Enghien. The combined fleet sailed out of Marseille on the 5th of August.

Siege

The Ottoman force first landed at Villefranche, 6 kilometers east of Nice, which it took and destroyed.

The French and Ottoman forces then collaborated to attack the city of Nice on 6 August 1543. In this action 110 Ottoman galleys combined with 50 French ones.

The Franco-Ottomans were confronted by a stiff resistance which gave rise to the story of Catherine Ségurane, culminating with a major battle on 15 August, but the city surrendered on 22 August. The French prevented the Ottomans from sacking the city. They could not however take the castle, the "Château de Cimiez", apparently because the French were unable to supply sufficient gunpowder to their Ottoman allies.

Another important battle against the castle took place on 8 September, but the force finally retreated upon learning that an Imperial army was on the move to meet them: Duke Charles III, ruler of the Duchy of Savoy, had raised an army in Piedmont to free the city.

The last night before leaving, Barbarossa plundered the city, burned parts of it, and took 5,000 captives. The relief army, transported on ships by Andrea Doria, landed at Villefranche, and successfully made its way to the Nice citadel.

During the campaign, Barbarossa is known to have complained about the state of the French ships and the inappropriateness of their equipment and stores. He famously said "Are you seamen to fill your casks with wine rather than powder?". He nevertheless displayed great reluctance to attack Andrea Doria when the latter was put in difficulty after landing the relief army, losing 4 galleys in a storm. It has been suggested that there was some tacit agreement between Barbarossa and Doria on this occasion.

Catherine Ségurane

Catherine Ségurane (Catarina Ségurana in the Niçard dialect of Provençal) is a folk heroine of Nice said to have played a decisive role in repelling the city's siege by Turkish invaders allied with Francis I, the siege of Nice, in the summer of 1543. At the time, Nice was part of Savoy, independent from France, and had no standing military to defend it. Most versions of the tale have Catherine Ségurane, a common washerwoman, leading the townspeople into battle. Legend has it that she knocked out a standard-bearer with her beater and took his flag.

Catherine's existence has never been definitively proven, and her heroic act of mooning is likely pure fiction or highly exaggerated; Jean Badat, a historian who stood witness to the siege, made no mention of her involvement in the defense. Historically attested defense of Nice include the townspeople's destruction of a key bridge and the arrival of an army mustered by a Savoyard duke, Charles III. Nevertheless, the legend of Catherine Ségurane has excited the local imagination. Louis Andrioli wrote an epic poem about her in 1808, and a play dedicated to her story was written by Jean-Baptiste Toselli in 1878. In 1923, a bas-relief monument to Catherine was erected near the supposed location of her feat. In Nice, Catherine Segurane Day is celebrated annually, concurrent with St. Catherine's Day on 25 November.

Ottoman wintering in Toulon

Following the siege, the Ottomans were offered by Francis to winter at Toulon, so that they could continue to harass the Holy Roman Empire, and especially the coast of Spain and Italy, as well the communications between the two countries. Barbarossa was also promised that he would receive help from the French in reconquering Tunis if he stayed through the winter in France.

Throughout the winter, the Ottoman fleet, with its 110 galleys and 30,000 troops, was able to use Toulon as a base to attack the Spanish and Italian coasts under Admiral Salah Rais. They raided Barcelona in Spain, and Sanremo, Borghetto Santo Spirito, Ceriale in Italy, and defeated Italo-Spanish naval attacks. Sailing with his whole fleet to Genoa, Barbarossa negotiated with Andrea Doria the release of Turgut Reis. France provided about 10,000,000 kilograms of bread to supply the Ottoman army during the 6 months it stayed in Toulon, and for the provisioning of the following summer's campaign and return to Constantinople.

It seems the involvement of Francis I to this joint effort with the Ottomans were rather half-hearted however, as many European powers were complaining about such an alliance against another Christian power. Relations remained tensed and suspicious between the two allies.

Aftermath

A French-Habsburg peace treaty was finally signed at Crépy on 18 September 1544, and a truce was signed between the Habsburg and the Ottomans on 10 November 1545. The Habsburg emperor Charles V agreed to recognize the new Ottoman conquests. A formal peace treaty was signed on 13 June 1547, after the death of Francis I.

A local consequence of the siege was the reinforcement of the coast with defensive fortifications, especially the castles of Nice and Mont Alban, and the fort of Saint-Elme de Villefranche.

See also
Orientalism in early modern France

Notes

References
 William Miller The Ottoman Empire and Its Successors, 1801–1927 Routledge, 1966 
 Peter Malcolm Holt, Ann K. S. Lambton, Bernard Lewis The Cambridge History of Islam Cambridge University Press, 1977 
 Roger Crowley, Empire of the sea, 2008 Faber & Faber 
 Baghdiantz McAbe, Ina 2008 Orientalism in Early Modern France, Berg Publishing, Oxford

External links
  Anthem for Catherine Ségurane.
 Information from the City of Nice's website (in French)

Nice
History of Nice
Islam in France
Suleiman the Magnificent
Conflicts in 1543
Nice
Nice
Nice
Nice
Nice
Nice
1543 in France
1543 in the Holy Roman Empire
1543 in the Ottoman Empire
Italian War of 1542–1546
Charles V, Holy Roman Emperor